Wayne Towne Center is a regional shopping center located in Wayne, New Jersey, in the New York City metropolitan area, adjacent to Willowbrook Mall along Willowbrook Boulevard. The center formerly operated as an indoor shopping mall from the time when JCPenney was built, in the late 1980s, until its de-malling in 2008. The inner portion of the mall, which had one floor has since been demolished.

The center is anchored by JCPenney, Costco, Dick's Sporting Goods, Nordstrom Rack. Of the four anchors, JCPenney has been there the longest as it was built along with the original mall. Costco had previously been located in a former Price Club in another shopping center across Willowbrook Boulevard, and decided to move to Wayne Towne Center and its own building when its lease expired. Dick's had long been attached to the center during the de-malling process and eventually opened in 2014. The other anchor was added in 2015, with one anchor that was once 24 Hour Fitness.

History
The complex dates back to 1974 as a strip mall called West Belt Mall that had  of retail space and was steadily expanded over time, ultimately being renamed Wayne Towne Center in 1989 as a way to upgrade its image.

Existing in the shadow of Willowbrook Mall, Wayne Towne Center has had difficulty dating back to 1993, when the Neiman Marcus Last Call outlet headed for Pennsylvania.

In January 2008, the Borders Books and Music, which replaced Last Call, was one of three North Jersey locations closed by the chain.  The portion of the mall that housed the Borders store was demolished in Fall 2008.

Later in 2008, the mall began undergoing what is referred to as "de-malling", which refers to a process where an enclosed shopping center slowly begins a transition to a more traditional shopping center. In order to accomplish this, the remaining stores in the mall were closed one a time as were two of its anchor stores, Old Navy and Loehmann's. The TGI Friday's restaurant that was located in the mall was replaced by a freestanding location in the parking lot, and the remaining two anchors (JCPenney and Fortunoff) sealed off their mall entrances. The TGI Friday's in the frontmost parking lot was joined by Olive Garden and Bahama Breeze restaurants and a DSW Shoe Warehouse store, while a Chipotle Mexican Grill location was added in the JCPenney rear parking lot. Fortunoff went out of business in 2009, thus costing the mall its second anchor, and construction on other buildings stalled when Dick's Sporting Goods chose to pull out temporarily.

In a deal closed on December 28, 2010, the mall was purchased by Vornado Realty Trust for $12.1 million from Wells Fargo, along with annual lease payments of $2.5 million for the land. A Vornado spokesman said that the company planned to revamp the property, as Vornado had previously done at The Outlets at Bergen Town Center in Paramus, New Jersey.

In March 2014, construction began again in earnest and accelerated. The 215,000 square foot Fortunoff store, after undergoing asbestos abatement, was demolished. Dick's Sporting Goods reconsidered its decision to leave and in November 2014, a two-level store was opened adjacent to JCPenney. One month earlier, Costco opened its new location. Panera Bread opened in the vacant rear half of the Chipotle building. A La-Z-Boy furniture store was added in the JCPenney rear parking lot in mid 2015. A two-story Nordstrom Rack opened in October 2015 and a two-story 24 Hour Fitness opened in January 2016.

References

External links
 International Council of Shopping Centers: Wayne Towne Center

1974 establishments in New Jersey
Buildings and structures in Passaic County, New Jersey
Shopping malls in New Jersey
Tourist attractions in Passaic County, New Jersey
Wayne, New Jersey
Demolished shopping malls in the United States
Shopping malls established in 1974
Shopping malls in the New York metropolitan area